Sehome is a neighborhood in Bellingham, Washington.

The neighborhood is named after S'Klallam Chief Sehome (S-yah-whom). The neighborhood was first platted in 1858 by E.C. Fitzhugh.

Sehome was originally owned by the Bellingham Bay and British Columbia Railroad, which operated the Bellingham Bay Coal Mine, later named Sehome Coal Mine.  (incorporated on July 16, 1888). 

Bellingham, Washington
Neighborhoods in Washington (state)